Mesilla is a genus of South American anyphaenid sac spiders first described by Eugène Simon in 1903.  it contains only two species.

References

External links

Anyphaenidae
Araneomorphae genera